Tamta Goduadze (born 10 January 1981), known mononymously as Tamta, is a Georgian-Greek singer. She first achieved popularity in Greece  in 2004 for her participation in Super Idol Greece, in which she placed second. She went on to release several charting albums and singles in Greece and Cyprus, also becoming a mentor on X Factor Georgia in 2014, and The X Factor Greece in 2016.

She represented  in the Eurovision Song Contest 2019 with the song "Replay", finishing in 13th place with 109 points.

Early life
Goduadze was born and raised in Georgia, where she started singing at the age of five. At the age of 14, Goduadze married her 16-year-old boyfriend and gave birth to their daughter, Annie. While raising her daughter, she graduated from high school and attended Tbilisi State University.

Goduadze divorced her husband after six years of marriage, and she later left Georgia with their daughter and emigrated to Greece. Goduadze's mother and younger brother had previously emigrated to Greece, where her mother found work as a housekeeper. In Greece, Goduadze settled in Athens, but did not have a residence permit; she made money by assisting her mother as a housekeeper.

Career

2003–2006: Super Idol and beginnings
In 2003, while she was working as a housekeeper in Athens, one of the families Goduadze worked for recommended her to audition for Super Idol, in order to receive a residence permit. She entered the talent show, and subsequently became a finalist. Goduadze went on to place as the show's runner-up, behind winner Stavros Konstantinou. Following her appearance on Super Idol, Goduadze was signed to Greek record label Minos EMI to begin a music career. Her first single "Eisai To Allo Mou Miso" featuring Stavros Konstantinou was released in 2004 and later Goduadze began live appearances with Antonis Remos and Giorgos Dalaras.

In early 2006, Goduadze released her debut studio album Tamta by label MINOS EMI. The same year, Goduadze began live appearances with Thanos Petrelis, Katerina Stanisi and Apostolia Zoi in Apollonas. Also, she received the award for "Best New Artist" at the Mad Video Music Awards.

2007–2009: Agapise me, soundtracks, and advertising campaign
In January 2007, Hellenic Radio and Television (ERT), announced Goduadze's participation in the Greek national final for the Eurovision Song Contest 2007, competing with the song "With Love". Despite only placing third in the competition, "With Love" still went on to become a widely successful song in Greece, peaking at number two on the Greek singles chart. Her second studio album Agapise me was later released on May 16, 2007. The same year, Goduadze performed the soundtrack of the TV series Latremenoi Mou Geitones, "Ela Sto Rhythmo", the soundtrack of LACTA's advertising campaign, "Mia Stigmi Esu Ki Ego" and became ambassador of the company SKECHERS & AVON Cosmetics.

In June 2008, Goduadze stated in an interview that she would like to represent Cyprus in the Eurovision Song Contest 2009. Rumours also stated that the Cyprus Broadcasting Corporation (CyBC) had been in contact with her since May of that year. In response, Greek media outlets also demanded that ERT choose Goduadze to represent Greece in the Eurovision Song Contest 2009, following suspicions of favouritism from Eastern Bloc countries in the Eurovision Song Contest 2008 where Kalomira finished in third place. The rumours ultimately did not materialise and ERT chose Sakis Rouvas for the contest.

In early 2009, Goduadze released the single "Koita me" to radios as the first single from her upcoming album.

2010–2013: Tharros i alitheia and Rent
In March 2010 her third studio album "Tharros I Alitheia" was released. Also, Goduadze released a single with the same name featuring Sakis Rouvas. The same year, she released two more singles, "Egoista" featuring Isaias Matiaba and "Fotia". For one season (2010-2011), Goduadze played in the Greek version of the musical Rent.

In 2011, Goduadze released two singles: "Zise To Apisteuto" and "Tonight" featuring Claydee & Playmen. The same year, she performed live in Thessaloniki with Sakis Rouvas and Eleni Foureira.

In 2012, she released two singles: "Niose Tin Kardia" and "Konta Sou".

2013 saw the release of two singles "S' Agapao" and "Pare Me". Also, during the 2013–2014 season, Goduadze performed live in Teatro Music Hall Athens with Paola, Pantelis Pantelidis and Stan.

2014–2019: The X Factor, Cabaret, attrattivo x Tamta, and Eurovision
In 2014, Tamta released the singles "Gennithika Gia Sena" featuring Xenia Ghali and "Den Eimai Oti Nomizeis". During season 2014–2015, she was a judge and mentor in X Factor Georgia. In 2015, Tamta released the single "Unloved" which was intended for the Greek participation in Eurovision Song Contest 2015. In 2016, Tamta released the single "To Kati Parapano". From April 2016 to April 2017, she was a judge and mentor in The X Factor Greece.

Also, in 2017, she released the singles "Protimo", "Ilious Kai Thalasses" and "More Than A Summer Love" (English version of Ilious Kai Thalasses). During season 2017–2018, Tamta played the role of Sally Bowles in the Greek version of musical "Cabaret". In early 2018, Tamta appeared live in BOX Athens with Melisses, DJ Young, Konnie Metaxa & Animando. Later that year, she released the singles "Arxes Kalokairiou" with an English version "Tag You In My Sky" and the soundtrack of movie "The Bachelor", "Na Me Pareis Makria". In late 2018, Tamta released her first clothing collection with Atrattivo.

In December 2018, it was revealed that Tamta would represent Cyprus at the Eurovision Song Contest 2019 with the song "Replay". Tamta had previously been offered the chance to represent Cyprus at the Eurovision Song Contest 2018 with the song "Fuego", but declined the offer due to scheduling issues. Greek singer Eleni Foureira went on to represent the country instead, placing second in the competition, Cyprus' best result of all-time. Both songs were written by Greek-Swedish songwriter Alex P. The music video was released on March 5, 2019. At Eurovision, Tamta achieved 13th place with 109 points.

After Eurovision, she released two songs: "Señorita" featuring Snik and "Sex With Your Ex". In the season 2019–20, she performed live with Melisses, Elena Tsagrinou and Matina Zara.

2020-present: AWAKE
In 2020, Goduadze released four songs with videoclips: "S' Agapo", directed by her and Paris Kassidokostas-Latsis, "Yala" featuring Stephane Legar, "Den Eisai Edo" featuring Mente Fuerte and "Hold On", directed by her and Kassidokostas too, during their vacation in Milos. On July 3, 2020, she released her debut English EP, "Awake".

Personal life
Since early 2015, Goduadze has been in a relationship with Paris Kassidokostas-Latsis.

Discography

Tamta (2006)
Agapise Me (2007)
Tharros I Alitheia (2010)
Awake (Tamta EP) (2020)

Filmography

References

External links

1981 births
21st-century Greek women singers
21st-century women singers from Georgia (country)
Arion Music Awards winners
Eurovision Song Contest entrants for Cyprus
Eurovision Song Contest entrants of 2019
Greek laïko singers
Greek pop singers
Georgian emigrants to Greece
Idols (franchise) participants
Living people
MAD Video Music Awards winners
Minos EMI artists
Naturalized citizens of Greece
Musicians from Tbilisi
Pop singers from Georgia (country)
Singers from Athens
Super Idol (Greek TV series)
Tbilisi State University alumni